Mary Mesquita Dahlmer (born Mary Perry Mesquita; 12 October 1897 – 14 October 1993) was an American carillonneur, the first to be employed as one in the United States, and the first woman carillonneur in North America.

Life and career 
As a member of the Church of Our Lady of Good Voyage in Gloucester, Massachusetts, she helped raise funds to build the church's 23-bell Taylor carillon by selling flowers. The carillon was inaugurated on July 23, 1922 by church organist George B. Stevens. When he was unavailable to play for a wedding on July 30, Dahlmer was asked based on her abilities as a pianist to fill in for him. She was subsequently appointed carillonneur, and studied with Anton Brees and Kamiel Lefévere. She was often asked to demonstrate the carillon for visitors, and in the process performed for John D. Rockefeller Jr., Franklin Delano Roosevelt, and Mrs. Hugh Bancroft. She also had a career at the Frank E. Davis Fish Company. Dahlmer retired from her carillon post in 1945, after 25 years. In 1987, Dahlmer was elected an honorary member of The Guild of Carillonneurs in North America.

References

External links 
 Audio of Mary Mesquita Dahlmer performing on the carillon of the Church of Our Lady of Good Voyage
 Oral history interview with Mary Mesquita Dahlmer, conducted by David Masters, in "Toward an oral history of Cape Ann: Dahlmer, Mary," Sawyer Free Library, Gloucester, Mass.

Carillonneurs
1897 births
1993 deaths
20th-century American women musicians
20th-century American musicians
People from Gloucester, Massachusetts
Musicians from Massachusetts
American keyboardists
American people of Portuguese descent
20th-century classical musicians